Michael Niavarani (born April 29, 1968 in Vienna, Austria) is an Austrian-Persian stand-up comedian in the tradition of Austrian cabaret, an author, and a TV and movie actor. Niavarani, whose comedic work often draws on his inter-cultural upbringing, is a central figure of the Austrian cabaret scene. Since 1992, he has been director of the Kabarett Simpl, a famous Viennese cabaret that opened its doors in 1912. In 2010, Niavarani won the Austrian Kabarett Award. 
He is also a three times winner of the Romy award.

Books

References

External links 
 
 

1968 births
Living people
Austrian comedians
Austrian male film actors
Male actors from Vienna
Austrian people of Iranian descent
Austrian cabaret performers
Austrian male television actors
Niavarani family